The Coventry-class frigates were 28-gun sixth rate frigates of the Royal Navy, principally in service during the Seven Years' War and the American Revolutionary War. The 1750s were a period of considerable experimentation in ship design, and Slade authorized individual builders to make "such alterations withinboard as may be judged necessary" in final construction.

A total of twelve Coventry-class frigates were built in oak during the Seven Years' War. Eleven of these were ordered from private shipyards and built over the relatively short period of three years; the twelfth was completed following the close of the War in a royal dockyard after its original contractor became bankrupt.

A variant was designed for building with fir hulls rather than oak; five vessels were built to this design, all in Royal Dockyards. these five vessels differed in external appearance to the oak-built frigates, as they had a square tuck stern. The use of fir instead of oak increased the speed of construction but reduced the frigate's durability over time.

More than a quarter-century after the design was produced, two further oak-built ships to this design were ordered to be built by contract in October 1782. One of these was cancelled a year later, when the builder became bankrupt.

Ships

First batch

Second batch
5 fir-built ships
 Boreas
 Ordered: 18 April 1757
 Built by: Woolwich Dockyard.
 Keel laid:  21 April 1757
 Launched:  29 July 1757
 Completed:  6 September 1757
 Fate:  Sold 29 June 1770.
 Hussar
 Ordered: 18 April 1757
 Built by: Chatham Dockyard.
 Keel laid:  3 May 1757
 Launched:  23 July 1757
 Completed:  17 August 1757
 Fate:  Taken by the French off Cape Francois on 23 May 1762.
 Shannon
 Ordered: 18 April 1757
 Built by: Deptford Dockyard.
 Keel laid:  11 May 1757
 Launched:  17 August 1757
 Completed:  8 October 1757
 Fate:  Taken to pieces at Portsmouth Dockyard in December 1765.
 Trent
 Ordered:  5 May 1757
 Built by: Woolwich Dockyard.
 Keel laid:  19 May 1757
 Launched:  31 October 1757
 Completed:  23 November 1757
 Fate:  Sold at Portsmouth Dockyard on 26 January 1764.
 Actaeon
 Ordered:  5 May 1757
 Built by: Chatham Dockyard.
 Keel laid:  26 May 1757
 Launched:  30 September 1757
 Completed:  9 November 1757
 Fate:  Sold at Deptford Dockyard on 9 September 1766.

Third batch
9 oak-built ships
 Active
 Ordered: 6 May 1757
 Built by: Thomas Stanton & Co, Rotherhithe.
 Keel laid:  13 June 1757
 Launched:  11 January 1758
 Completed:  2 March 1758 at Deptford Dockyard.
 Fate:  Taken by the French Navy off San Domingo 1 September 1778.
 Aquilon
 Ordered: 6 May 1757
 Built by: Robert Inwood, Rotherhithe.
 Keel laid:  15 June 1757
 Launched:  25 May 1758
 Completed:  30 June 1758 at Deptford Dockyard.
 Fate:  Sold at Deptford 29 November 1776.
 Cerberus
 Ordered: 6 May 1757
 Built by: Pleasant Fenn, East Cowes.
 Keel laid:  13 June 1757
 Launched:  5 September 1758
 Completed:  11 November 1758 at Portsmouth Dockyard.
 Fate:  Burnt to prevent capture at Rhode Island 5 August 1778.
 Griffin
 Ordered: 6 May 1757
 Built by: Moody Janvrin, Bursledon.
 Keel laid:  June 1757
 Launched:  18 October 1758
 Completed:  13 March 1759 at Portsmouth Dockyard.
 Fate:  Wrecked off Barbuda 27 October 1761.
 Levant
 Ordered: 6 May 1757
 Built by: Henry Adams, Buckler's Hard.
 Keel laid:  June 1757
 Launched:  6 July 1758
 Completed:  16 June 1759 at Portsmouth Dockyard.
 Fate:  Taken to pieces at Deptford Dockyard in September 1780.
 Argo
 Ordered: 19 September 1757
 Built by: Henry Bird, Rotherhithe.
 Keel laid:  22 September 1757
 Launched:  20 July 1758
 Completed:  29 January 1759 at Deptford Dockyard.
 Fate:  Taken to pieces at Portsmouth Dockyard in November 1776.
 Milford
 Ordered: 19 September 1757
 Built by: Richard Chitty, Milford.
 Keel laid:  November 1757
 Launched:  20 September 1759
 Completed:  28 December 1759 at builder's shipyard.
 Fate:  Sold at Woolwich Dockyard on 17 May 1785.
 Guadeloupe
 Ordered: 19 September 1757
 (originally ordered from John Williams, Neyland (Pembs.), but the ordered was transferred to Plymouth Dockyard following Williams's bankruptcy in 1758.)
 Re-ordered: 29 June 1758
 Built by: Plymouth Dockyard.
 Keel laid:  8 May 1759
 Launched:  5 December 1763
 Completed:  11 July 1764.
 Fate:  Scuttled in York River, Virginia on 10 October 1781, but salved by the French Navy in which service she was maintained until 1786.
 Carysfort
 Ordered: 4 February 1764
 Built by: Sheerness Dockyard.
 Keel laid:  June 1764
 Launched:  23 August 1766
 Completed:  11 August 1767
 Fate:  Sold at Deptford Dockyard on 28 April 1813.

Final batch
2 oak-built ships, only 1 completed
 Hind
 Ordered: 2 October 1782
 Built by: Sheerness Dockyard.
 Keel laid:  February 1783
 Launched:  22 July 1785
 Completed:  24 November 1787 at Deptford Dockyard.
 Fate:  Taken to pieces at Deptford Dockyard in July 1811.
 Laurel
 Ordered: 22 October 1782
 Built by: Philemon Jacobs, Sandgate.
 Cancelled:  7 October 1783.

References

Bibliography
 David Lyon, The Sailing Navy List, Brasseys Publications, London 1993.
 .

Frigate classes
Ship classes of the Royal Navy